Sex Machine may refer to:

Human sexuality
 Sex machine, a mechanized apparatus that acts as an automated erotic stimulation device
 Virtual sex machine or teledildonics, computer-controlled sex toys
 Sex Machines Museum, a sex museum in Prague, Czech Republic

Music
 "Sex Machine", a song on the 1969 album Stand! by Sly and the Family Stone
 Sex Machine (album), a 1970 album by James Brown
 "Get Up (I Feel Like Being a) Sex Machine", a 1970 song by James Brown
 Live at the Sex Machine, a 1971 funk album by Kool and the Gang
 Carter the Unstoppable Sex Machine, a British indie rock band
 Sex Machineguns, a Japanese speed metal band

Film
 Conviene far bene l'amore (1975), also released as The Sex Machine
 Sex Machine (1980 film), a pornographic film starring Jack Wrangler
 Sex Machine, a character in the 1996 film From Dusk Till Dawn

People
Santana Sexmachine, Swedish-German drag queen

See also
Fucking Machines